The 1992 New York Mets season was the 31st regular season for the Mets. The Mets entered the season attempting to improve on their 1991 season, where due in part to a second half collapse they finished 78-84 and recorded their first losing record since 1983. Instead, they had a worse record of 72-90, missing the playoffs for the 4th consecutive year. All 81 of the Mets' home games were played at Shea Stadium.

Background
After contending for most of the first two-thirds of the 1991 season, the Mets stumbled from second place to fifth at the end of the season. The collapse cost second-year manager Bud Harrelson his job, as he was fired toward the end of the campaign. To replace him the Mets brought in Jeff Torborg, who had led the Chicago White Sox to second place in the American League West in 1991. In memory of the man responsible for bringing National League baseball back to New York, the Mets wore a memorial patch for William A. Shea during this season.

Major acquisitions
The Mets' front office went to work trying to rebuild their squad that was only three years removed from their last playoff appearance. Their biggest acquisition was Pittsburgh Pirates outfielder Bobby Bonilla, who signed a five-year contract for just over $29 million that was one of the largest in league history at the time.

The Mets also made it a point to get a top starting pitcher that would complement Dwight Gooden and David Cone at the front of the rotation, deciding to part ways with former Cy Young Award winner and 1991 National League All-Star Frank Viola after he lost ten of his last twelve decisions and finished with a 13-15 record. The pitcher they decided on was the two-time former Cy Young winner Bret Saberhagen, who had spent his entire career to this point as a member of the Kansas City Royals. A former All-Star and world champion, Saberhagen posted a 13-8 record and a 3.07 ERA for the 1991 season, and was one of seven pitchers that year to throw a no-hitter. 

The price the Mets paid to acquire Saberhagen, however, was fairly steep as they were forced to give up two of their more productive offensive pieces. One of those players was their former top prospect, Gregg Jefferies; although he had not realized his full potential to this point in his career, Jefferies had managed to lead the Mets in batting average in 1991. The other was veteran outfielder Kevin McReynolds, who had been a consistent middle-of-the-lineup bat; he finished second on the Mets in hits, doubles, home runs, and RBI in 1991 and, although his batting average was not particularly high, finished tied with Howard Johnson for second in batting average. 

The Mets' acquisitions were rounded out by a pair of veterans. Second baseman Willie Randolph, who had spent 1991 with the Milwaukee Brewers, was brought in to replace Jefferies and had finished among the American League leaders in batting average the year before. To add some power to the lineup, the Mets also brought in Eddie Murray, who had been playing first base for the Los Angeles Dodgers.

Returning players
Although the Mets lost their leading hitter when they acquired Saberhagen, they were returning the defending National League leader in home runs and runs batted in with utility man Howard Johnson. The pitching staff would be led by ace Dwight Gooden, coming off a 13-7 campaign, and #2 starter David Cone, who had led the league in strikeouts en route to a 14-14 season which he finished with a one-hit, nineteen-strikeout performance against the Philadelphia Phillies; his strikeout total for the game tied the then-National League record.

Season

Despite the high expectations, the Mets regressed and finished the season with a 72-90 record, their first 90-loss season since 1983. The team managed to hover near .500 at the All-Star Break but only won thirty times afterward.

The two marquee acquisitions for the Mets both fizzled in their first year in New York. Bonilla, despite improving his home run total from 1991 by one, drove in only 70 runs and hit below .250, drawing boos from the local fans who were expecting more from him given his record contract. Saberhagen was injured and ineffective throughout the season and only recorded fifteen starts with a 3-5 record. Their other two major additions had other luck. Murray, at 36, managed to hit 16 home runs and drive in 93 runs, but Randolph was injured for most of the season and only managed to play 90 games in what proved to be his final year as an active ballplayer.

Howard Johnson's numbers also fell as he battled injuries, with his home run total reduced to seven in 100 total games. No Mets player hit more than nineteen home runs (Bonilla), and Daryl Boston was the only other Met who reached double digit home runs with eleven. In addition, only Bonilla and Murray recorded fifty or more RBIs for the season and, among qualified batters, the highest average anyone recorded was Murray's .261.

The pitching staff also had its share of issues. Closer John Franco missed much of the year with injuries, so the Mets decided to give the closer’s role to Anthony Young, who had not pitched particularly well as a starter. After he found initial success, converting his first twelve save opportunities, he blew five of his last eight and took the loss in all five. After winning his first two decisions as a starter, Young would take the loss in the remaining fourteen games where he was the pitcher of record, leaving him with a 2-14 overall mark for the season. 

Sid Fernandez led the Mets in wins and ERA, while in contrast Gooden posted his worst record as a starter to that point in his career, finishing at 10-13 and with a career low 145 strikeouts. Saberhagen, the major offseason acquisition, only managed to record a 3-5 record in seventeen games with fifteen starts as injuries kept him out of the rotation. 

In August, the Mets parted ways with David Cone after he recorded a 13-7 record and 214 strikeouts, the latter total leading the National League. Cone was traded to the Toronto Blue Jays for two prospects, one of which was future All-Star second baseman Jeff Kent. Cone’s strikeout total, which was frozen once he left the Mets, held until late in the year when John Smoltz of the Atlanta Braves passed it by recording his 215th strikeout. Despite that, Cone finished with the overall league lead in strikeouts (261), a 17-10 record, and his first World Series championship as the Blue Jays defeated Smoltz’s Braves in that year’s contest.

Criticism
The fact that the Mets made such inroads to increase payroll with little to no result, combined with the distant attitudes and actions of some of the players and Jeff Torborg's inability to maintain control of the chaotic situation, led to a controversial account of the inner workings of the Mets during that 1992 season. The book was written by current North Jersey Media Group writer Bob Klapisch and current New York Daily News baseball writer John Harper, and titled The Worst Team Money Could Buy: The Collapse of the New York Mets,

Shortly after the book's April 1993 release, Klapisch was confronted by an irate Bobby Bonilla. Bonilla threatened Klapisch and kept trying to goad him into a physical confrontation.

Offseason
 December 2, 1991: Bobby Bonilla was signed as a free agent by the Mets.
 December 10, 1991: Hubie Brooks was traded by the Mets to the California Angels for Dave Gallagher.
 December 11, 1991: Kevin McReynolds, Gregg Jefferies and Keith Miller were traded by the Mets to the Kansas City Royals for Bret Saberhagen and Bill Pecota.
 December 11, 1991: Jeff Gardner was traded by the Mets to the San Diego Padres for Steve Rosenberg.
 December 20, 1991: Willie Randolph was signed as a free agent by the Mets.

Regular season

Season standings

Record vs. opponents

Opening Day starters
 Bobby Bonilla
 Daryl Boston
 Kevin Elster
 Dwight Gooden
 Howard Johnson
 Dave Magadan
 Eddie Murray
 Charlie O'Brien
 Willie Randolph

Notable transactions
 April 12, 1992: Julio Valera was traded by the Mets to the California Angels for Dick Schofield and a player to be named later. The Angels completed the deal by sending Julian Vasquez (minors) to the Mets on October 6.
 June 1, 1992: Darin Erstad was drafted by the Mets in the 13th round of the 1992 Major League Baseball Draft, but did not sign.
 August 27, 1992: David Cone was traded by the Mets to the Toronto Blue Jays for Jeff Kent and a player to be named later. The Blue Jays completed the deal by sending Ryan Thompson to the Mets on September 1.

Roster

Player stats

Batting

Starters by position
Note: Pos = Position; G = Games played; AB = At bats; H = Hits; Avg. = Batting average; HR = Home runs; RBI = Runs batted in

Other batters
Note: G = Games played; AB = At bats; H = Hits; Avg. = Batting average; HR = Home runs; RBI = Runs batted in

Pitching

Starting pitchers
Note: G = Games pitched; IP = Innings pitched; W = Wins; L = Losses; ERA = Earned run average; SO = Strikeouts

Other pitchers
Note: G = Games pitched; IP = Innings pitched; W = Wins; L = Losses; ERA = Earned run average; SO = Strikeouts

Relief pitchers
Note: G = Games pitched; W = Wins; L = Losses; SV = Saves; ERA = Earned run average; SO = Strikeouts

Farm system

LEAGUE CHAMPIONS: Binghamton

External links
1992 New York Mets at Baseball Reference
1992 New York Mets team page at www.baseball-almanac.com

References

New York Mets seasons
New York Mets season
New York Mets
1990s in Queens